Wathone (lit. "Earth" from Pali vasundra), born Khin Hla, was a prominent Burmese painter, best known for his watercolor and batik paintings. He was the subject of a documentary called A Sketch of Wathone, directed by Kyi Phyu Shin, which won the best shorts award at the National Geographic Society's 2008 All Roads Film Festival. He died at his home in Thingangyun Township, Yangon, in 2008.

References

People from Yangon
Burmese cartoonists
1947 births
2008 deaths
20th-century Burmese painters